The ember tetra (Hyphessobrycon amandae) is a freshwater fish of the characin family (family Characidae) of
order Characiformes. It is native to the Araguaia River basin of Brazil and was discovered in 1987 and named in honor of the fish explorer Heiko Bleher's mother (Amanda Bleher).

The eye frequently mirrors the color of the fish and is outlined in black.

The fish's natural diet consist of small invertebrates and plants.

Although somewhat hard to find in fish stores, H. amandae is commonly kept as an aquarium fish by hobbyists.

In the aquarium
The minimum tank size requirement for the Ember tetras is at least 10 gallons with few live aquarium plants. Ember tetras should be kept in acidic water with a pH near 6.6, and although their native habitat has very soft water they have adapted quite well to a wide range of hardness (5–17 dGH). The recommended temperature range is between 23–29 C (73–84 F). 

Ideally their tank should contain live plants, a darker substrate, and open water for swimming. Ember tetras should be kept in groups of at least 6, though recommended number is 9-10, in order to promote schooling. They appreciate a heavily planted aquarium, ideally with a small area shaded from direct light and will spend a lot of time swimming through planted areas, which also offer some protection for their fry.

Ember tetras will school with other tetras, such as the neon tetra, but may become stressed by the presence of significantly larger fish.

These fish swim at the middle level of the aquarium, and they don't feed from the bottom of the tank. Therefore, it is recommended that they are kept with other bottom dwelling fish (such as pygmy corydoras) so that leftover food is then eaten up off the substrate and not left to waste.

Ember tetras can be fed a variety of foods, including flake, frozen, and freeze dried food. Small live foods like worms and brine shrimp are also recommended as they bring out the fish's colors.

In a well maintained heavily planted aquarium, Ember tetras have been known to live ten years or more.

See also
List of freshwater aquarium fish species

References

The Aquarium Wiki

Tetras
Fish described in 1987
Taxa named by Jacques Géry